Bhupinder Singh (born 31 October 1986) is an Indian-born New Zealand former cricketer. He played 22 first-class and 26 List A matches for Auckland between 2009 and 2014. He also represented New Zealand A on their 2010 tour in Zimbabwe.

At the 2017 New Zealand general election, he stood for ACT New Zealand in the Manukau East electorate.

See also
 List of Auckland representative cricketers

References

External links
 

1986 births
Living people
New Zealand cricketers
Auckland cricketers
Punjabi people
People from Kapurthala
Indian emigrants to New Zealand
New Zealand people of Punjabi descent
New Zealand sportspeople of Indian descent
ACT New Zealand politicians
New Zealand sportsperson-politicians
Unsuccessful candidates in the 2017 New Zealand general election